Nybergsund Stadion is an association football venue located in Trysil, Norway. It is the home ground of Nybergsund IL-Trysil in the First Division. The pitch has artificial turf. The pitch has a capacity of 1,500 seated spectators, in addition to standing places.

References

Football venues in Norway
Sports venues in Innlandet
Trysil